St. Paul's Missionary College (abbreviated to SPMC) is a Maltese junior school and secondary school situated on Emmanuele Vitale Street in Rabat, Northern Region.

History
Founded as a non-fee-paying school by Joseph De Piro, it received its first intake in October 1964, in what was then the library of the motherhouse that the Missionary Society of St Paul has in Rabat. The school was the brainchild of Stanley Tomlin.

In its first years, both the academic and support staff were all MSSP members. Work on the present premises of the school started in 1974 and was completed in 1982 with the inauguration of St Agatha's Auditorium. It was completed when the college was the only non-fee-paying private school in Malta, and MSSP members had no fixed income. Over the years, there have been developments in the school curriculum, particularly in science, information technology, and modern languages (French and German). 

The junior school received its first intake in October 2011, after construction works were done on the former Depiro Youth Centre building.

See also

 Education in Malta
 List of schools in Malta

References

External links
 
 mssproma.paulistmissionaries.org, the website of the Missionary Society of St Paul

1984 establishments in Malta
Educational institutions established in 1964
Rabat, Malta
Catholic schools in Malta
Catholic secondary schools in Europe
Secondary schools in Malta